Northbridge or North Bridge may refer to:

Places 
 Australia
 Northbridge, New South Wales, a suburb of Sydney
 Northbridge, Western Australia, a suburb of Perth
 Long Gully Bridge, a bridge between the Sydney suburbs of Cammeray and Northbridge

 England
North Bridge, Halifax

 Poland
North Bridge, Warsaw

 Scotland
 North Bridge, Edinburgh, a bridge linking the old and new towns
Northbridge, marketing name for residential developments in Sighthill, Glasgow 

 United States
 Northbridge, Massachusetts, a suburb of Worcester
 North Bridge (Harrisburg), crossing the Susquehanna River at Harrisburg, Pennsylvania
 The North Bridge, colloquially called the Old North Bridge, Concord, Massachusetts, focal point of the Battle of Concord
 Mark Morris Memorial Bridge, connecting Clinton, Iowa, and Fulton, Illinois

Other uses 
 Northbridge (computing), a chip that implements the "faster" capabilities of the motherboard

See also 
 Nordbrücke (disambiguation) (German for Northbridge)